This article lists events that occurred during 1988 in Estonia.

Incumbents

Events
 13 April – Estonian Popular Front was established. The front organized mass demonstrations against Soviet powers throughout July and August.
 16 June – First Secretary of Communist Party of Estonia Karl Vaino was replaced by Vaino Väljas.
 July – Intermovement was established.
 In Estonia, 300,000 demonstrated for independence.
 Estonian language became the official language of Estonia.
 16 November – The Supreme Soviet of the Estonian SSR declared that Estonia is "sovereign" but stopped short of declaring independence.

Births
 6 December - Sandra Nurmsalu, musician, in Alavere, Harju County
 17 December:
 Liisa Ehrberg, racing cyclist
 Grethe Grünberg, ice dancer, in Tallinn

Deaths

See also
 1988 in Estonian television

References

 
1980s in Estonia
Estonia
Estonia
Years of the 20th century in Estonia